Hanwara is a village in the Mahagama CD block in the Godda subdivision of the Godda district in the Indian state of Jharkhand.

Geography

Location                                            

Overview
Rajmahal coalfield is shown in the map. The entire area is overwhelmingly rural with only small pockets of urbanisation.

Note: The full screen map is interesting. All places marked on the map are linked and you can easily move on to another page of your choice. Enlarge the map to see what else is there – one gets railway links, many more road links and so on.

Demographics
According to the 2011 Census of India, Hanwara had a total population of 4,128, of which 2,175 (53%) were males and 1,953 (47%) were females. Population in the age range 0–6 years was 864. The total number of literate persons in Hanwara was 1,811 (55.48% of the population over 6 years).

Civic administration

Police station
Hanwara police station serves Mahagama CD block.

Education
Hanwara Government High School is a Hindi-medium coeducational institution established in 1975. It has facilities for teaching in classes IX and X.

References

Villages in Godda district